Antonio Marceglia (28 July 1915, Pirano – 13 July 1992, Venice) was a captain in the Naval Engineers during World War II. 
A municipal swimming pool at 245 via Sandro Gallo in Lido di Venezia is named after him.

Life 
Marceglia incumbent in 1933 as an officer cadet in the naval engineers. In 1938, he graduated from the University of Genoa and became a Sottotenente. On 10 June 1940 (the day Italy declared war on the United Kingdom) he joined the submarine Ruggero Settimo, in which he took part in three missions in the Mediterranean. In October that year he joined the Gruppo Mezzi d'Assalto, and after spending his time training on the River Serchio, he took part in two missions against the Royal Navy base in Gibraltar on 26 May and 20 September 1941.

He also joined the Raid on Alexandria on 19 December 1941, which seriously damaged the battleships Valiant and Queen Elizabeth, the tanker Sagona and the destroyer Jervis. Marceglia was captured during the operation and held in POW camps in Palestine and India. He returned to Italy in February 1944 following her surrender to the Allies and joined the Mariassalto unit fighting alongside the Allies. He requested leave and in December 1945 became an lieutenant colonel commanding a naval shipyard in Venice. He later became a member of the Consiglio Superiore of the Banca d'Italia under the governorship of Carlo Azeglio Ciampi. His death was reported in the Italian newspapers and also in The Times, which ran a long obituary for his noble effort, unparalleled devotion for nation and uncompromising attitude.

References

External links 
 Motivazione della Medaglia d'Oro e cenni sulla carriera, on the Marina Militare Italiana - URL verified 21 January 2015
 Motivazione della Medaglia d'Oro al Valor Militare, on the official site of the Presidenza della Repubblica Italiana - URL verified 21 January 2015
 Genio Navale, on the official site of the Marina Militare Italiana
 Addio all' eroe di Alessandria Antonio Marceglia. Nel dicembre 1941 affondo' la " Queen Elizabeth " al largo delle coste egiziane. In carcere assieme a Durand de la Penne, autore dell' impresa contro la corazzata "Valiant" , from the "Corriere della Sera" online archive, 15 July 1992 - URL accessed 21 January 2015
 Antonio Pannullo, Ricordo di Antonio Marceglia, il marò che mise in ginocchio l'Inghilterra, in «Il Secolo d'Italia» online, 13 July 2015 - URL accessed 21 January 2015
 "Times" onora Marceglia. L' autorevole quotidiano "The Times" dedica un necrologio d 4 colonne corredato di fotografia all' ex nemico ufficiale della marina militare italiana Antonio Marceglia, from the online archive of the Corriere della Sera», 18 July 1992 - URL accessed 21 January 2015

1915 births
1992 deaths
Regia Marina personnel of World War II
People from Piran